Deer Creek is an unincorporated community and census-designated place in Winfield Township, Lake County, Indiana, United States. As of 2020, its population was 115.

Geography

References

Unincorporated communities in Lake County, Indiana
Unincorporated communities in Indiana
Census-designated places in Lake County, Indiana
Census-designated places in Indiana